Grejohn Kyei (born 12 August 1995) is a French professional footballer who plays as a striker for Clermont.

Club career
Kyei is a product of the youth academy of Stade de Reims. He made his Ligue 1 debut on 12 April 2015 against OGC Nice replacing Nicolas de Préville after 74 minutes in a 1–0 home defeat.

Kyei helped Stade de Reims win the 2017–18 Ligue 2 and promote to the Ligue 1 for the 2018–19 season.

In August 2018, Kyei joined Ligue 2 club RC Lens on loan for the season with Lens securing an option to sign him permanently.

In August 2019, Kyei joined Swiss Super League club Servette FC on a three-year contract.

On 31 January 2022, Kyei returned to France and signed with Ligue 1 side Clermont until the end of the 2021–22 season.

International career
Kyei was born in France and is of Ghanaian descent. He is a one-time youth international for France.

Career statistics

Club

Honours
Reims
 Ligue 2 (1): 2017–18

References

External links
 

1995 births
Living people
French footballers
France under-21 international footballers
French sportspeople of Ghanaian descent
Association football forwards
Stade de Reims players
RC Lens players
Servette FC players
Clermont Foot players
Ligue 1 players
Ligue 2 players
Swiss Super League players
French expatriate footballers
Expatriate footballers in Switzerland
French expatriate sportspeople in Switzerland